George Ernest Bastin (20 August 1893 – 13 March 1947) was an  Australian rules footballer who played with St Kilda in the Victorian Football League (VFL).

Notes

External links 

1893 births
1947 deaths
Australian rules footballers from Victoria (Australia)
St Kilda Football Club players